The Brandon Travellers were a Canadian junior 'A' ice hockey team based in Brandon, Manitoba that played in the Manitoba Junior Hockey League from 1973 to 1980. The team was owned by the Western Hockey League's Brandon Wheat Kings.

Travellers' alumni to play in the National Hockey League included Dave Semenko, Ron Hextall, Glen Hanlon, and Laurie Boschman. Former NHL coach and scout Andy Murray started his coaching career with the Travellers.

Season-by-season record
Note: GP = Games Played, W = Wins, L = Losses, T = Ties, OTL = Overtime Losses, GF = Goals for, GA = Goals against

Playoffs
1974 Lost Quarter-final
Portage Terriers defeated Brandon Travellers 4-games-to-none
1975 DNQ
1976 Lost Semi-final
Brandon Travellers defeated Portage Terriers 4-games-to-2
Selkirk Steelers defeated Brandon Travellers 4-games-to-1
1977 Lost Semi-final
Brandon Travellers defeated Selkirk Steelers 4-games-to-3
Dauphin Kings defeated Brandon Travellers 4-games-to-0
1978 Lost Quarter-final
Dauphin Kings defeated Brandon Travellers 4-games-to-2
1979 Lost Quarter-final
Selkirk Steelers defeated Brandon Travellers 4-games-to-2
1980 Lost Quarter-final
Dauphin Kings defeated Brandon Travellers 4-games-to-2

References

External links
 Brandon Travellers season statistics and records at The Internet Hockey Database

Defunct Manitoba Junior Hockey League teams
Ice hockey in Brandon, Manitoba
1973 establishments in Manitoba
1980 disestablishments in Manitoba
Ice hockey clubs established in 1973
Sports clubs disestablished in 1980